Harold Melville Burrows Jr (December 24, 1924 — September 20, 2014) was an American tennis player.

Burrows was raised in Charlottesville, Virginia and served in Europe during the war as a radio operator with the 81st Squadron of the 436th Troop Carrier Group. After the war he captained University of Virginia in collegiate tennis and was a three-time state champion, before graduating in 1950.

Active on tour in the 1950s, Burrows's career included a singles title at the Paris International Championships in 1951. His doubles partnership with Straight Clark ranked amongst the top in the world, with their best win coming in the quarter-finals of the 1953 U.S. National Championships over Lew Hoad and Ken Rosewall, who were trying to complete the calendar grand slam. In 1954 he became the first native of Virginia to play Davis Cup tennis and was part of a winning campaign. He featured in the preliminary America Zone fixtures against the Caribbean and Cuba.

Burrows served as a representative for Charlottesville on the Virginia House of Delegates from 1960 to 1962. He was a member of the Democratic Party. In 1990 he was an inductee in the Virginia Sports Hall of Fame and Museum.

See also
List of United States Davis Cup team representatives

References

External links
 
 
 

1924 births
2014 deaths
American male tennis players
Tennis people from Virginia
Virginia Cavaliers men's tennis players
United States Army Air Forces personnel of World War II
Democratic Party members of the Virginia House of Delegates
People from Charlottesville, Virginia